Thala kawabei is a species of sea snail, a marine gastropod mollusk, in the family Costellariidae, the ribbed miters.

Distribution
This species occurs in Kyushu.

References

Costellariidae